Salmon Creek is a river located in Tompkins County, New York. It flows into Cayuga Lake by Myers, New York.

References

Rivers of Tompkins County, New York
Rivers of New York (state)